Sebhel (also Sib'il, Sebaail, Sebeel) is a village located in the Zgharta District in the North Governorate of Lebanon.  Its population is Maronite Catholic.

References

External links
Sebaal, localiban
Ehden Family Tree

Zgharta District
Populated places in the North Governorate
Maronite Christian communities in Lebanon